Kraybill is a form of the surname Graybill. It may refer to:

 Donald Kraybill (born 1945), American scholar who works on Anabaptism, especially the Amish 
 Kraybill Conflict Style Inventory, an inventory developed by Ronald S. Kraybill